John David Robb (born 4 May 1961) is an English musician and journalist best known as the bassist and singer for the mid-1980s post punk band The Membranes. 

He writes for and runs the Louder Than War website and a monthly music magazine of the same name. He has written several books on music and occasionally makes media appearances as a music commentator. He is also the vocalist in the punk rock band Goldblade. Since 2014 Robb has run the music writing festival Louder Than Words which is held in Manchester every November, and is a TEDx speaker and spoken word artist.

Early life
Robb was born in Fleetwood, Lancashire and grew up in Anchorsholme, Blackpool, Lancashire. He attended Blackpool Sixth Form College an addition to the Collegiate Grammar School which Robb attended, where after reading about the emerging punk rock scene in the music press in 1976 he was inspired to start his own band. He is a supporter of Blackpool F.C. stating in January 2013, "I was born in Blackpool and supporting your local team is one of those things that gets under your skin for life."

Music
Robb was inspired by the DIY ethic of punk to form The Membranes in 1977, the band releasing several albums in the 1980s. The band split up in 1990 with Robb forming Sensuround, releasing two singles in the early 1990s. In 1994 he formed Goldblade, who have released albums including 2005's Rebel Songs and 2008's Mutiny and single "City of Christmas Ghosts" featuring Poly Styrene on shared vocals. In 2013 Goldblade released the album The Terror of Modern Life via Overground Records.

The Membranes reformed in 2010 appearing at the All Tomorrow's Parties Festival at the request of My Bloody Valentine and released the 7" vinyl single "If You Enter The Arena, You Got To Be Prepared To Deal with the Lions" (Louder Than War Records) – The single was released on Record Store Day 20 April 2012; the track was The Guardian 'Single of the Week'. Tim Burgess from the Charlatans released their next comeback single, "The Universe Explodes Into  A Billion Photons Of Pure White Light" and the band released a new album, Dark Matter/Dark Energy in June 2015 on Cherry Red. In 2016, the band played concerts with a 25 piece choir in the UK and Europe and have lined up a remix album called Inner Space/Outer Space.. In 2019 The Membranes released the acclaimed What Nature Gives...Nature Takes Away  album on Cherry Red Records.

The group believe that 'every gig must be an event' and have promoted sell out shows where they explain the universe with scientists from the Higgs Boson project and a sold-out gig at the top of Blackpool Tower in August.   Robb produced several bands and in the mid-1990s two singles by the Leicester three-piece Slinky and US punk band Done Lying Down, as well as Therapy? and Cornershop who he also co-managed.

Television 
Robb has appeared as a pundit on various television programmes including BBC Breakfast, Channel 4's "top 100" shows, BBC's I Love the 60s/70s/80s/90s series and Seven Ages of Rock. He has contributed to BBC 2's The Culture Show as well as several appearances on TV documentaries as well as on Channel 4 news talking about train travel, music piracy and the state of music, and on BBC radio commenting on pop culture. He has been a contributor to Sky's The Pop Years and co-produced and presented a ten-part series on the history of punk rock. He also presented a twelve-part guide to the arts in North West England. He is currently filming a series of interviews for Lush's Gorilla channel with cultural figures including Stewart Lee, Mark Thomas, Shaun Ryder, Viv Albertine, Caroline Lucas, and Youth. In 2021 he became the coproducer of a new documentary about Alan McGee and launched his own youtube channel to feature further interviews with cultural figures. In 2021/22 he was a regular on many music documentaries on Channel 5 and BBC2

Journalism and books 
Robb has worked as a journalist for many years. He published his own small town fanzine, Rox which would go on to be nationally distributed, while a member of The Membranes. He wrote for ZigZag in the 1980s, and was a regular freelance contributor to Sounds in the late 1980s, as well as writing for Melody Maker. He now writes for The Sunday Times, The Observer, The Guardian, The Independent, several websites, The Big Issue and magazines in Turkey, Algeria, America, Russia, and Brazil.

While working for Sounds, Robb was the first journalist to interview Nirvana (in 1988), and also later coined the word 'Britpop'.

In 2011, Robb launched an online rock music and pop culture magazine/blog called Louder Than War, focusing on arts news, reviews, and features. The site claims editorial independence, and includes contributions from Robb and several other freelance journalists and critics. In its first year, in November 2011, Robb was voted to win the UK Association of Independent Music 'Indie Champion' award. The website was also turned into a nationally distributed magazine in 2016.

Robb currently contributes a column to Viva!Life magazine, published by the Vegan campaigning charity Viva!

Robb's books include a biography of The Stone Roses, Stone Roses and the Resurrection of British Pop; Punk Rock: An Oral History which has been translated into several different languages; Death To Trad Rock, an account of the 1980s UK DIY underground, including The Membranes, Three Johns, The Nightingales, and Big Flame; The North Will Rise Again – Manchester Music City from 1976 to 1996, an oral history of Manchester music which received 4/5 stars in Q magazine and 5/5 stars in Mojo magazine. He co-wrote  'Manifesto’ about the life and future green and Eco vision of green energy pioneer Dale Vince which was released in Dec 2019.

In 2023 he released the book 'The Art Of Darkness - The History Of Goth', a definitive survey of the form.

Published works 
 The Stone Roses and the Resurrection of British Pop. Ebury Press, 1996. 
 Noise Bible – Adventures on the Eighties Underground with the Membranes. Thrill City.
 The Soul Manual. Ultimate.
 The Charlatans: We Are Rock. Ebury Press. 
 The Nineties: What the Fuck Was That All About. Ebury Press. 
 Punk Rock: An Oral History. Ebury Press, 2006. 
 The North Will Rise Again – Manchester Music City 1976–1996. Aurum Press, 2009. 
 Death to Trad Rock – The Post-Punk Fanzine Scene 1982–1987. Cherry Red, 2009. 
 The Stone Roses and the Resurrection of British Pop: The Reunion Edition. Ebury Press, 2012. 
 Manifesto. Ebury Press, 2012. 
 The Art of Darkness : The History Of Goth. (Louder Than War Books) 2023.

References

External links
Louder Than War
John Robb's writing for The Guardian

1961 births
Living people
English male journalists
English male non-fiction writers
English music journalists
English biographers
English rock bass guitarists
Male bass guitarists
English male singers
People from Fleetwood
People from Thornton-Cleveleys
Academics of the University of Salford
Male biographers